The Fulton Market Building is a renovated building that once housed the Fulton Fish Market, on Fulton Street in the Financial District of Lower Manhattan. It served as the venue for the 2016 World Chess Championship.

References 

South Street Seaport
Culture of Manhattan
Financial District, Manhattan